Harare Central Prison (HCP; named Salisbury Central Prison until 1982) is a medium-security prison for both men and women in Harare, Zimbabwe. It is operated by the Zimbabwe Prison Services, previously the Rhodesia Prison Service. It opened in 1910 during company rule in Rhodesia. The current Officer in Charge, or warden, is Never Kambizi.

History

20th-century 
Salisbury Central Prison was established in 1910 during company rule in Rhodesia, soon to become the Colony of Southern Rhodesia in 1923.

During the 20th-century, the prison incarcerated many black nationalists who fought white rule during the colonial period and later UDI. In addition, the prison has been used to hold political prisoners after Zimbabwe's independence.

A 1973 study found that over a period of two months, 97% of admitted inmates were black Africans, and 50.6% were younger than 28.

21st-century 
In mid-March 2009, Harare Central Prison cut prisoners' rations by 75% in response to a food shortage. Two days later, the prison ran out of food completely.

In 2013, two Congolese inmates, living in the remand section, who claimed to practice Satanism and thrive on human blood, caused unrest among the inmates. Prison authorities worked to find means to send the inmates back to the Congo to resolve the situation.

Description 
The Harare Central Prison building was constructed in 1910. It is located just east of Harare city center. The property is bordered by the Morris Depot police training facility, a Zimbabwe National Army cantonment, the Presidential Guard compound, and Zimbabwe Republic Police headquarters. It is close in proximity to the State House and Zimbabwe House, and a short distance away from Central Intelligence Organisation employee housing and the residence of the Commissioner of Police.

The prison is divided into three main sections: prison cells, remand holding cells, and a workshop. The prison was designed with a capacity of 1,470, as of 2013, it houses 1,622 inmates, and often holds up to 2,000. This overpopulation means that many cells meant to hold one inmate now hold three. Though it is a medium-security prison, there is a maximum-security section for prisoners serving life sentences. The prison houses both men and women, some together with their children.

The workshop is used for rehabilitating prisoners. There, they are instructed in various fields such as auto mechanics, welding, molding, carpentry, television and radio repair, panel beating, and bookbinding. Most of the equipment and machinery in the workshop is original to the prison's founding, and some of it is nonfunctional. The prison's limited funding has prevented the purchase of new resources. In addition to the workshop, there is a school providing a primary, secondary, and tertiary education to inmates and their children. Some of the school's ten teachers are inmates themselves who have a background in education. Despite the school's limited educational resources, the Ordinary level pass rate is 69%. The prison has ablution facilities, some of which are in poor condition, and a kitchen which provides the inmates with three meals per day. Many of the prison kitchen's electric pots are not functional and some food is cooked outside using firewood. There is also a chaplain who baptizes inmates and preaches to them. There is also a prison choir made up of inmates.

The prison has a two-ward hospital with 13 beds. One ward serves as the tuberculosis unit, while the other is the "Multi-Disease Ward". The hospital also includes an opportunistic infection clinic, outpatient department, and a dental unit with modern equipment and full-time dental therapist. The prison suffers from a high mortality rate, a prevalence of communicable diseases, and shortages of food, clothing, and medicine.

Notable inmates

Notable escapees 
The prison has seen a number of jailbreaks.

In April 1980, more than 200 remand prisoners escaped.

References 

1910 establishments in Southern Rhodesia
Buildings and structures in Harare
Prisons in Zimbabwe
Government buildings completed in 1910